The Cottage at Rock and Dubuque Streets is a historic building located in Solon, Iowa, United States.  It is a good example of applying elements of the Queen Anne style to a small-scale residence.  The railroad arrived in Solon in 1870, which allowed the availability of ready made millwork for its construction.  It was built sometime after 1870.  The 1½-story frame structure has two porches.  They feature turned columns, posts, and simple turned gingerbread ornamentation.  The cottage was listed on the National Register of Historic Places in 1985.

References

Houses completed in 1870
Queen Anne architecture in Iowa
Houses in Johnson County, Iowa
National Register of Historic Places in Johnson County, Iowa
Houses on the National Register of Historic Places in Iowa